Kisite-Mpunguti Marine National Park is situated on the southern coast of Kenya near Shimoni and south of Wasini Island in Kwale County near the Tanzanian border.

The park covers an area with four small islands surrounded by coral reef.

Marine life is in abundance, including trigger fish, moray eels, angelfish, butterfly fish, groupers, parrotfish, wrasses, scorpionfish, pufferfish, damselfish, rays, snappers, green sea turtles,  hawksbill turtles, and dolphins. Humpback whales and whale sharks are seasonal.

References

External links 
 

 

Marine parks of Kenya
National parks of Kenya
East African coral coast